Saint-Sylvain may refer to several communes in France:

Saint Sylvain, Calvados, in the Calvados département 
Saint-Sylvain, Corrèze, in the Corrèze département 
Saint-Sylvain, Seine-Maritime, in the Seine-Maritime département 
Saint-Sylvain-d'Anjou, in the Maine-et-Loire département